Joseph S. Miller (August 18, 1848February 22, 1921) was a Commissioner of Internal Revenue at the Internal Revenue Service in the United States. His state was West Virginia.

Early life and education
Joseph S. Miller was born on August 18, 1848, in Cabell County, Virginia, now part of West Virginia. Miller was of German descent. Miller received a common school education, and then attended and graduated Beach Grove Academy in Ashland, Kentucky.

Career
Miller served as clerk for the Circuit Court of Cabell County from 1860 to January 1873. Miller served as Clerk of the County Court from 1873 to 1875. Miller served as Clerk of the Senate of West Virginia from 1872 to 1876. Miller served as councilman for Barboursville from 1874 to 1875. He later served two terms of West Virginia State Auditor. Initially, Miller ran in the 1884 West Virginia gubernatorial election, but dropped his campaign before the Democratic Convention, and backed the nominee, Emanuel Willis Wilson.

Miller, appointed by President Grover Cleveland, served as IRS Commissioner from March 20, 1885, to March 20, 1889, and from April 19, 1893, to November 26, 1896.

Personal life
Miller was married and had children.

Death
Miller died on February 22, 1921, in a hospital in Huntington, West Virginia.

See also
Joseph S. Miller House

References 

1848 births
1921 deaths
American people of German descent
Commissioners of Internal Revenue
People from Barboursville, West Virginia
Legislative clerks
West Virginia Democrats
State auditors of West Virginia
19th-century American politicians
People from Kenova, West Virginia
West Virginia city council members